Democracy is an American quarterly journal of progressive and liberal politics, as well as culture, founded by Kenneth Baer and Andrei Cherny in 2006. Democracy is intended to be the progressive/liberal answer to such prominent and influential conservative journals as The Public Interest, Policy Review, Commentary, and The National Interest. Baer and Cherny state in a message to readers in the first issue that they intend to "regenerate the strength of the progressive movement" with "big ideas." Contrasting themselves with National Review's William F. Buckley, Baer and Cherny proclaim their journal will "stand athwart history and yell, Forward!" The editors put forward Democracy as "a place where ideas can be developed and important debates can be spurred" at a "time when American politics has grown profoundly unserious."

Baer told The Hill: "We think that the party is rich in tactics and poor in ideas. What we really need for long-term success is deep, serious thinking about how we’re going to apply long-held progressive values to new challenges." Cherny added: "I had started thinking about where all of the conservative ideas, for better or worse, had come from. Every big idea — Social Security privatization, supply-side economics, preemption, faith-based initiatives — had come out of one of their journals in their intellectual infrastructure."

In an editorial for the Los Angeles Times on July 10, 2006, Baer and Cherny laid out a case for making a break with what they characterized as the "ad hoc approach to politics" they claim the current Democratic Party is engaged in.

On March 3, 2009, Michael Tomasky replaced Kenneth Baer as editor when Baer left to become associate director of the White House's Office of Management and Budget.

References

External links
Democracy official website

Political magazines published in the United States
Quarterly magazines published in the United States
Magazines established in 2006
Modern liberal magazines published in the United States
Magazines published in Washington, D.C.